born 7 March 1985 in Itaocara, Rio de Janeiro is a Brazilian footballer who plays for FC Gifu.

Club statistics
Updated to 23 February 2016.

References

External links

Profile at FC Gifu

1985 births
Living people
Brazilian footballers
Brazilian expatriate footballers
Expatriate footballers in Japan
Expatriate footballers in Azerbaijan
Expatriate footballers in Venezuela
Association football midfielders
Campeonato Brasileiro Série B players
Azerbaijan Premier League players
J2 League players
Olaria Atlético Clube players
Treze Futebol Clube players
América Futebol Clube (MG) players
Shamakhi FK players
Qarabağ FK players
FC Gifu players
America Football Club (RJ) players
Sportspeople from Rio de Janeiro (state)